Shareek-e-Hayat is a Pakistani anthology series, aired on Hum TV. It is Produced by Wajahat Rauf under Showcase Productions. Each episode consist of different love story. It also selected by India's Zindagi TV, aired from 5 April 2015 under the title, Saare Mausam Tumse Hee.

Episodes

Cast

 Danish Taimoor 
 Ayeza Khan
 Urwa Hocane
 Mawra Hocane
 Agha Ali
 Badar Khalil
 Yumna Zaidi
 Saba Qamar
 Junaid Khan
 Shehzad Sheikh
 Eshita Mehboob
 Sumbul Iqbal
 Sania Saeed
 Behroze Sabzwari
 Humayun Ashraf
 Sana Javed
 Azfar Rehman
 Soniya Hussain
 Saif-e-Hassan
 Faiza Hasan
 Sanam Chaudhry
 Hiba Ali
 Parveen Akbar
 Jinaan Hussain
 Farhan Ali Agha
 Mansha Pasha

References

External links
Saare Mausam Tumse Hee

2010s anthology television series
Hum TV original programming
Pakistani television series
Urdu-language television shows
Television anthology episodes
Pakistani anthology television series